Livermore Sanitarium was a private sanitarium and psychiatric hospital, located in Livermore, California, in operation from 1894 until 1965. The facility specialized the treatment and research of alcoholism and mental disorders. During this time period the Livermore Valley was considered an ideal climate for optimizing one's health.

History 
The Livermore Sanitarium was founded by Dr. John W. Robertson, he had previously worked at Napa State Hospital in the alcohol treatment clinic. The main facility building was the former William Mendenhall Estate on College Avenue in Livermore; previously owned by one of the founders of the town,  (1823–1911); and another facility building located next door was the former Livermore Collegiate Institute (also known as the Old Livermore College). In June 1909, the college building burned down and was rebuilt. The grounds had separate cabins for the patients. 

In 1904, he built a hydro-sanitarium facility, for water-based treatments and therapy. In 1912, a gym was built that included exercise equipment, a swimming pool, and a bowling alley - during this time period it was an unusual to find such amenities at a medical facility. By 1920, there were 120 patients. In the 1960s, new medical approaches to psychiatry were discovered and popularity of this type of hospital declined.  

The sanitarium closed in 1965. The property now serves as a housing department.  

Another private sanitarium in Livermore was the Arroyo del Valle Sanitarium (1918–ca. 1960), specializing in the treatment of tuberculosis.

See also 

 List of hospitals in California

References 

History of Alameda County, California
1894 establishments in California
Psychiatric hospitals in California